The Invasion of Guadeloupe (8–10 August 1815) was the last conflict between French and British forces during the Napoleonic Wars, and took place after Napoleon's defeat at Waterloo.

Background
Guadeloupe had been captured by the British twice before, most recently in 1810, but had been returned to the French following Napoleon's first abdication in April 1814. Louis XVIII had appointed Admiral Charles-Alexandre Léon Durand Linois as governor, with General Eugène Édouard Boyer de Peyreleau as his deputy. News of Napoleon's return from exile in Elba in February 1815 eventually reached the island in May, and divided it. Linois remained loyal to the King, while Boyer-Peyreleau led the Bonapartists. On 15 June the schooner Argile arrived from France with orders to rally Guadeloupe and Martinique to Bonaparte's cause.

Boyer-Peyreleau attempted to persuade Linois to declare his support for Bonaparte, but he refused, so on 18 June Boyer-Peyreleau began arresting key officials and held Linois under house arrest. The next day Linois reluctantly declared his support for the new regime. However, unknown to them, Bonaparte had been defeated at Waterloo on 18 June, and would abdicate soon after. Meanwhile, on Martinique, the governor, Comte Pierre de Vaugiraud, had requested British assistance in holding the island on behalf of the French king, with British troops landing there in June.

The expedition

On learning of the situation in Guadeloupe, the commander of British forces in the West Indies, Lieutenant-General Sir James Leith, a veteran of the Peninsular War, promptly assembled an expeditionary force, with naval support under the command of Rear-Admiral Sir Philip Durham. De Vaugiraud provided the corvettes Acteon and Diligent, and the schooner Le Messager, with a contingent of French troops from Martinique. The British troops were organised into three brigades, commanded by major-generals Sir Charles Shipley, Stehelin and Douglass. They consisted of the 1st battalions of the 15th, 25th, 63rd regiments of foot; the Royal West India Rangers, the York Chasseurs and the Royal York Rangers, and detachments of the West India Regiment.

Royal Navy forces seized the Îles des Saintes on 6 July, and occupied the island of Marie-Galante on the 18th. The 1st Division of British ships carrying troops from South America and the Windward Islands sailed from Carlisle Bay, Barbados, on 31 July, meeting the 2nd Division, with troops from St. Lucia, Martinique, and Dominica, off the Îles des Saintes. The 1st Division anchored in the Bay of St. Louis at Marie Galante, on 2 August, threatening a landing at Pointe-à-Pitre and Fort Fleur, while the 2nd Division remained off the Saintes, threatening Basse-Terre. Rumours of Bonaparte's defeat had begun to reach Guadeloupe in July, but were dismissed as British propaganda by Linois and Boyer-Peyreleau. On 3 August, Captain Andrew Leith Hay, Leith's nephew and aide-de-camp, arrived at Basse-Terre under a flag of truce with a proclamation detailing Bonaparte's abdication, and demanding that the French lay down their arms. They refused. However, on 7 August French newspapers from Barbados and Martinique arrived, with definitive news from Europe.

Battle
At dawn the next day, 8 August, the British 1st and 2nd brigades landed at Anse Saint-Sauveur, on the south-eastern coast of Basse-Terre Island, driving the opposing French troops up into the hills. The following day the 3rd Brigade landed at Baillif, on the south-western coast, preventing the scattered French forces from regrouping. Later that day Linois requested the British name their conditions. The following day, 10 August, he signed the capitulation.

Aftermath

Guadeloupe remained under British occupation until returned to France in April 1816. In November 1816 General Leith received the Order of Military Merit from France.

References

1815
Guadeloupe
1810s in Guadeloupe
1815 in the Caribbean
Guadeloupe
Guadeloupe
Guadeloupe
Guadeloupe
History of Guadeloupe
August 1815 events